PAST (Polish Telephone Joint-stock Company), also known as PASTa, was a Polish telephone operator in the period between World War I and World War II. 

It is notable for its main headquarters in the Śródmieście Północne neighbourhood of the borough of Śródmieście in Warsaw, which at the time of its construction was the first skyscraper in the Russian Empire and the tallest building of Warsaw. The fight for the building during the Warsaw Uprising of 1944 also added to the legend of the place.

History 
The Swedish-owned company Towarzystwo Akcyjne Telefonów, also known as Cedergren, won a tender in 1900 to expand the Warsaw telephone network. For that purpose, two buildings were built at Zielna street in downtown Warsaw, holding the telephone exchange and the company's headquarters. 

The building was built between 1904 and 1910 and was constructed in two phases. The lower part, designed by L. Wahlman, I.G. Clason and B. Brochowicz-Rogoyski, was completed in 1904-1905; the upper part was added in 1907-1910. The building was one of the first reinforced concrete constructions of its magnitude in Europe.

The Cedergren licence expired in 1922 and the building was consequently taken over by the PAST company. This is why it was referred to by Varsovians either by the name of Cedergren or PAST, or, colloquially, "Pasta". During the German occupation of Poland, it was the regional telephone centre for General Government. During the Warsaw Uprising, on August 20, 1944, the building was captured by Polish insurgents of AK battalion "Kiliński” after 20 days of bloody fighting. The building was severely damaged. It was rebuilt in a simplified architectural form after World War II. The company was not recreated after the war, and its assets were nationalised by the Polish communist authorities.

The historic Próżna Street is right around the corner of the building.

In 2003, Kotwica, a World War II emblem of the Polish Underground State and Armia Krajowa, was placed on top of the company's former headquarters.

Gallery

See also
Prudential, Warsaw
List of tallest buildings in Poland

References

External links

 Old and modern pictures of PAST building
 Old and modern pictures of neighbouring building
 1938 Warsaw telephone directory published by PAST (large .pdf file)
 PASTa - page about Warsaw architecture

Buildings and structures in Warsaw
Defunct companies of Poland
Warsaw Uprising